Joli chaos is an album by Daniel Bélanger, released in 2008 on Audiogram. It was released as a double album, consisting of a greatest hits compilation on the first disc and ten previously unreleased rarities on the second.

Track listing

Disc One
 Sèche tes pleurs
 La folie en quatre
 Ensorcelée
 Opium
 Quand le jour se lève
 Sortez-moi de moi
 Cruel (Il fait froid, on gèle)
 Les deux printemps
 Imparfait
 Je fais de moi un homme
 Intouchable et immortel
 Fous n'importe où
 Dans un spoutnik
 Dis tout sans rien dire
 Rêver mieux
 L'échec du matériel
 La fin de l'homme
 Amusements
 Je suis mort

Disc Two

 Jamais content
 C'est la loi
 En ce monde
 Les criquets
 Soleil gratuit
 Étreintes
 L'Aiguiseur de ciseaux
 Imparfait (mix inédit)
 Joli chaos
 Le Dernier souffle

Credits (CD 1)
Tracks 1, 2, 3, 4 and 5 from Les Insomniaques s'amusentTracks 6, 7, 8, 9 and 10 from Quatre saisons dans le désordreTracks 11, 12, 13, 14 and 15 from Rêver mieuxTracks 16, 17, 18 and 19 from L'Échec du matériel

References

2008 greatest hits albums
Daniel Bélanger albums
Audiogram (label) compilation albums